Gorbatov is a town in Pavlovsky District of Nizhny Novgorod Oblast, Russia, located on the bank of the Oka River in the Meshchera Lowlands. Population:  It was previously known as Gorbatovo (until 1779).

History
The region was settled by the Meshchera tribe during the Middle Ages. The village of Gorbatovo was first documented in 1565 as a votchina of Prince Alexander Gorbaty-Shuysky after whom it takes its name. Its growth was owing to the manufacture of ropes and cherry cultivation. In 1779, Gorbatovo was merged with Meshchera sloboda and chartered as a town. Modern Gorbatov is one of Russia's smallest towns.

Administrative and municipal status

Within the framework of administrative divisions, it is, together with sixteen rural localities, incorporated within Pavlovsky District as the town of district significance of Gorbatov. As a municipal division, the town of district significance of Gorbatov is incorporated within Pavlovsky Municipal District as Gorbatov Urban Settlement.

References

Notes

Sources

External links

Official website of Gorbatov 
Gorbatov Business Directory spravbiz.ru 

Cities and towns in Nizhny Novgorod Oblast
Gorbatovsky Uyezd